WMJL-FM (102.7 FM) is a radio station  broadcasting a Country format. Licensed to Marion, Kentucky, United States. As of April 1, 2018, the station changed ownership to Sun Media.

With new ownership, came a new format and other programming changes. Now broadcasting a country music format, instead of Classic Hits, and adding a live and local morning show, a first in WMJL's history.

References

External links
River Country 102.7 Facebook

MJL-FM